Jordan McLean is a New York City-based composer, arranger, bandleader, trumpeter, producer and educator.  McLean has been active in the professional music world since 1995, having performed, recorded and collaborated with a multitude of musicians, ensembles and performance organizations around the world.

Early life and education
Born in New Rochelle, New York on April 24, 1974, McLean is the only child of Alan and Cynthia McLean (computer analyst and painter/community activist respectively). He was raised in and around New York City, including Hell's Kitchen, Astoria and Mamaroneck.  At age 6, McLean began piano lessons with Michael Raskin, son of famed composer Gene Raskin and was given his first trumpet at age 10 via the PS 111 band program.  McLean attended high school in Leonia, NJ.  While attending high school from 1988 until 1992, McLean studied trumpet with teacher Ed Treutal, theory and band practice with legendary band director Larry Silverman, and travelled to Manhattan School of Music to attend their Pre-College program (1991-1992).

After High School, McLean attended the Mannes College of music from 1992 to 1995 with a focus on Jazz Trumpet Studies, studying with Phil Grenadier and Dave Ballou. Other trumpet studies include years of mentorship with Steven Bernstein, and lessons with Cecil Bridgewater, Alex Holton, Steven Gluzband, Peck Almond, Laurie Frink, Michael Rodriguez and Sam Hoyt. In 2003 he enrolled at SUNY Purchase where he graduated summa cum laude in Classical Composition, was an ArtsBridge America Scholar and studied with compositional luminaries Dary John Mizelle and Joel Thome. In 2018 he returned to SUNY Purchase to complete a master's degree in studio composition, where he studied under Jakub Cuipinski and Adam Pietrykowski. His work there was recognized with the Graduate Award in Music & Technology.

Antibalas & FELA!

McLean is a charter member and lead trumpeter of the world-renowned Afrobeat band Antibalas, created in 1998 by Bosco Mann and Martin Perna. His work with the Afrobeat ensemble has led to collaborations with such iconic musical artists as David Byrne, St. Vincent (musician), Iron and Wine, Pretty Lights, TV on the Radio, Patti Smith, Chic, Alabama Shakes, Medeski Martin and Wood, The Roots, Public Enemy, Paul Simon, Rod Stewart, Beyoncé, Angelique Kidjo (including her 2007 Grammy-winning album, Djin Djin), My Morning Jacket, Azealia Banks and appearances on Saturday Night Live, VH1 Divas, and two of Comedy Central's “The Comedy Awards. Other TV appearances include Late Night with Jimmy Fallon, Jimmy Kimmel Live!, Conan, and The Late Show With David Letterman.  His radio credits include performances and interviews on Minnesota Public Radio, National Public Radio’s “All Things Considered,” KCRW’s “Morning Becomes Eclectic”, and multiple appearances on New York's W-BAI,  WNYC’s “Soundcheck”, Columbia University's WKCR, and the legendary KEXP in Seattle.

In 2006, McLean began work as the associate musical director, contributing composer/arranger and trumpeter for  Bill T. Jones’ 2009 Tony Award winning Broadway production of Fela! As a member of the Fela! band, he has performed at St. Ann's Warehouse, on the television programs The View and The Colbert Report, and has composed and arranged for Patti LaBelle. His work as a composer and arranger is featured on the Grammy nominated Fela! Original Broadway Cast Album.

Solo Career & Collaborations
McLean was the regular trumpeter for Iron & Wine in 2014, travelling throughout North America and Europe as part of the Ghost on Ghost touring band, including Matt Bauder and longtime collaborator Stuart Bogie.

McLean's has recorded sessions for Bosco Mann, Mark Ronson, Wyclef Jean and Tony Visconte as well as labels such as Daptone Records, Blue Note Records, Verve, Razor and Tie, Desco, Ropeadope Records, Ninja Tune, and JDub Records.

McLean has been featured as a trumpeter on record or in concert with artists such as Antibalas, Sharon Jones and The Dapkings, Charles Bradley, The Roots, Jamie Lidell, TV on the Radio, Ornette Coleman, David Byrne, St. Vincent, Patti Smith, Valery June, Angelique Kidjo, Amadou and Miriam, Nicole Atkins, Jose James, Patti Labelle, Nona Hendryx, Billy Gibbons, My Morning Jacket, The Alabama Shakes, Matisyahu, Santigold, Azelia Banks, The Yeah Yeah Yeahs, Cage The Elephant, Deer Tick, Tony Allen, David Murray, Sinkane, Atomic Bomb, Charles Llyod, Joshua Redman, Ori Kaplan, Dennis Charles, Craig Finn and The Hold Steady, Steven Tyler, The Lone Bellow, Joe Russo's Almost Dead, Dave Harrington, Brian Chase, The String Cheese Incident, Lady A, Strand Of Oaks, Thievery Corporation, Lux Prima, Amy Helm, Dr. Dog, Zach Bryan, Shantell Martin and others.

Droid

McLean formed Droid in 1998 with drummer Amir Ziv and keyboardist Adam Butler is a live experimental Drum N Bass ensemble, featuring keyboardists Adam Holzman and bassists Tim Lefavbre and Yossi Fine. Their initial release, NYC DNB was on Shadow Records and had tracks remixed by DJ Spooky.

Michael Leonhart Orchestra

As a long-time member of the Michael Leonhart Orchestra, McLean has performed with Elvis Costello, Randy Brecker, Donny MacCaslin, Ian Hendrickson-Smith, Keyon Harrold, Dave Guy, Freddy Hendrix, Frank David Greene and many others as part of the orchestra's residency at The Jazz Standard.

In 2013 McLean and drummer/performance artist John Walter Bollinger contributed to the video compilation of art pieces celebrating the 20th Anniversary of Hans Ulrich Obrist’s Do It.  The digital/vinyl release became the first release on Sound Chemistry Records which later became System Dialing Records, released in 2010.

Armo

In 2016 McLean and other members of Antibalas formed Armo, a small group dedicated to the union of Afrobeat and avant garde Jazz. The band has performed at clubs and other venues around New York, including NuBlu, Bar Lunatico, Brooklyn Bowl, Still Partners, Our Wicked Lady, Upland, and The Bitter End. They released a self-titled 10-inch 45 rpm EP on System Dialing Records in 2018 featuring original music by McLean and singer/pianist Amayo. The original members of the band include McLean, Amayo, singer/percussionist Marcus Farrar, bassist Justin Kimmel and guitarist Nikhil P. Yerawadekar. Frequent guest collaborators include trombonist Dave “Smoota” Smith, saxophonist Cocheme’a Gastellum, drummer Greg Gonzalez and other members of the Daptone Records family of musicians.

McLean was interviewed for a piece about the band in Relix Magazine in 2019. Around the same time as the formation of Armo, McLean co-founded the band Directors. Beginning as duo with Amir Ziv, the band expanded to include Nikhil P. Yerawadekar on bass, Ricardo Quinones on guitar and Sahr N’gaujah with whom McLean shared lead vocals. The band released a 5-song EP, ACTION!, on McLean's System Dialing Records in 2020.

The Sway Machinery

Since 2003 he has performed and recorded with The Sway Machinery, with whom he has performed in clubs and synagogues around the U.S. and festivals in Europe, Canada, Mexico, Australia and Mali, including the Festival Au Desert, outside of Timbuktu. He served as music director from 2019 to 2020 for the Because Jewish High Holidays series (with Sway Machinery as the house band) at Brooklyn Bowl and The Cutting Room. McLean has performed with The Sway Machinery in clubs and synagogues around the U.S. and festivals in Europe, Canada, Mexico, Australia and Mali, including the Festival Au Desert, outside of Timbuktu.

Fire Of Space

McLean has released two albums of original music with his nine-piece group, Fire Of Space, the first produced by Binky Griptite, the second by drummer Geoff Mann. The title track of their 2nd album “Handbasket” is featured in the film "Sleepwalk with Me."

The group has performed in venues throughout New York and Chicago, including as an opening act for Sharon Jones & The Dap-Kings.

The Lonesome Prairie Dogs

As a member of The Lonesome Prairie Dogs (featuring Lenny Kaye) McLean arranged and produced the recording of the bands EP on Dala Records, recorded at Dunham Studios in Bushwick, Brooklyn. McLean's work as a recording artist includes sessions for producers such as Bosco Mann, Mark Ronson, Wyclef Jean, Joel Hamilton, Josh Kaufman and Tony Visconte as well as labels such as Warner Music, Color Red Music, Daptone Records, Blue Note Records, Verve, Razor and Tie, Desco, Ropeadope Records, Ninja Tune, and JDub Records.

McLean has played Istanbul Jazz Festival and Montreux Jazz Festival, Bonnaroo, Coachella, WOMAD and many others, and toured coast-to-coast for two consecutive years playing the Canadian Jazz Festival circuit.

Hot Mustard

At the start of the pandemic McLean began a collaboration with the Charleston, SC based duo Hot Mustard (composed of producer/bass player Nick Carusos and producer/guitarist/graphic artist Jack Powell). McLean has written the brass arrangements for four Hot Mustard albums (the first two of which are released on the record label Color Red Music), and their cover of Naked When You Come. The Hot Mustard horn sessions were co-produced by and recorded at the studio of Dave “Smoota” Smith, where Smoota and McLean had been producing brass-forward tracks under the name Big Brass Beats.

Television Appearances
 The Tonight Show with Jimmy Fallon (Antibalas, Paul Simon, Rod Stewart, Steven Tyler, Jim James/Brittany Howard)
 CBS This Morning (Valerie June)
 Good Morning America (Steven Tyler)
 Conan (Iron & Wine)
 The Colbert Report (Fela! The Musical)
 The Late Show with Stephen Colbert (Zeshan B.)
 Jimmy Kimmel Live! (Antibalas, The Alabama Shakes)
 Late Night with Seth Meyers (Valerie June, The Hold Steady)
 The Late Show with David Letterman (Valerie June)

Other Notable Work
McLean's original compositions have been performed in New York and throughout Europe by contemporary music ensembles such as Cadillac Moon Ensemble and Till By Turning. He has adapted and conducted Mauricio Kagel's Music For Renaissance Instruments and actively commissions promising young arrangers for radical re-orchestrations of masterworks. Most recently he was commissioned by The Bronxville Public Library for a dance suit “Bronze In The Digital Age”, a multi-media piece based on five sculptures by Pierre Rodin, and a new work, PANGRAM, for Siren Baroque chamber orchestra. Along with Herbie Hancock, he was a spokesman for The 2013 UNESCO International Jazz Day.

As a bandleader, McLean has released two albums of original music with his nine-piece group, Fire Of Space. The title track of their album “Handbasket” is featured in the film Sleepwalk with Me. The group has performed in venues throughout New York and Chicago, including as an opening act for Sharon Jones & The Dap-Kings. McLean also served as a musical director for a suite of High Holiday services held at New York's Brooklyn Bowl.

As an educator, McLean has been an adjunct professor of musicology at his alma mater, SUNY Purchase.  He currently teaches private composition lessons at The New School for Jazz and Contemporary Music, where he completed jazz trumpet studies, and has over a decade of experience with LEAP (Learning through an Expanded Arts Program) as a visiting artist in NYC public schools.

System Dialing Records
In 2010 McLean founded System Dialing Records with drummer, Amir Ziv. Together they formed the electro-acoustic group DROID which features such esteemed musicians as the world renowned Brazilian percussionist Cyro Baptista and former Miles Davis music director Adam Holzman. McLean and Ziv have also started the duo Directors, focusing on creating music for film score, albums and live performance. Since the label's creation, McLean has produced a solo album for Jeremiah Lockwood, produced and released a solo album of his own entitled World Gone Mad and most recently released the full-length studio album “New Vocabulary” in collaboration with Ornette Coleman and Adam Holzman.

Discography

References

External links
 Profile at antibalas.com
 
 

American trumpeters
American male trumpeters
American soul musicians
Musicians from New York City
Musicians from New Rochelle, New York
1974 births
Living people
21st-century trumpeters
21st-century American male musicians
Antibalas members